Things We Lost in the Fire is a 2007 drama film directed by Susanne Bier, written by Allan Loeb, and starring Halle Berry and Benicio del Toro.

The film was released in the United States and Canada on October 19, 2007 and in the United Kingdom on February 1, 2008.

Plot
Audrey Burke and her warm and loving husband Brian have been happily married eleven years; they have a ten-year-old daughter named Harper and a six-year-old son named Dory. Jerry Sunborne is a heroin addict who has been Brian's close childhood friend for many years.

Audrey gets tragic news delivered to her door by the local police: Brian has been killed in an attempt to defend a woman who was being beaten by her husband. On the day of the funeral Audrey realizes that she has forgotten to inform Jerry of Brian's death. Her brother Neal delivers the message to Jerry and takes him to the funeral.

Audrey invites Jerry to move into the room adjacent to their garage, which he does. During his stay at the Burke home Jerry struggles to remain drug-free and also becomes very fond of Harper and Dory. The relationship between Jerry and Audrey is fragile and complicated. Jerry helps Audrey cope in many ways, including lying with her in bed to help her sleep. But Audrey, upset and confused, takes out her grief at Brian's death on Jerry. She becomes angry when Jerry helps Dory overcome his fear of submerging his head in the pool; something Brian had tried to do for a few years.

Eventually, Audrey demands that Jerry leave the house after he questions Audrey on her reaction to Harper playing hooky from school. This causes Jerry to relapse with heroin. Audrey and Neal rescue and rehabilitate Jerry, and he agrees to admit himself to a specialized clinic. At first Harper, who has come to love Jerry as much she did her father, is angry that he is leaving. But after he leaves her a heartfelt note she accepts that he is going.

Jerry is still struggling with his addiction but seems to be well on his way to recovery. He leaves red flowers on Audrey's doorstep with a note that reads "Accept the good," a phrase which Jerry himself had told Brian, and that Brian had subsequently said to Audrey many times.

Cast
 Halle Berry as Audrey Burke
 Benicio del Toro as Jerald "Jerry" Sunborne
 David Duchovny as Brian Burke (flashbacks)
 Alexis Llewellyn as Harper Burke
 Micah Berry as Dory Burke
 John Carroll Lynch as Howard Glassman
 Alison Lohman as Kelly
 Robin Weigert as Brenda
 Omar Benson Miller as Neal
 Liam James as David

Music

The soundtrack to Things We Lost in the Fire was released on October 30, 2007.

Reception

Box office
Things We Lost in the Fire grossed $3.2 million, and $5.2 million in other territories, for a worldwide gross of $8.5 million.

In the United States, the film finished 11th in its opening weekend with $1.5 million opening weekend.

Critical reception
On the review aggregator Rotten Tomatoes, the film holds an approval rating of 65% based on 128 reviews, with an average rating of 6.48/10. The site's critical consensus reads, "Things We Lost in the Fire is a well-acted, beautifully filmed reflection on love, loss, addiction and recovery from life's obstacles." On Metacritic, the film had an average score of 63 out of 100, based on 30 critics, indicating "generally favorable reviews".

Josh Rosenblatt of The Austin Chronicle gave the film 4 stars and said the film is "an impeccably constructed and perfectly paced drama of domestic and internal volatility." Rosenblatt wrote "Berry is brilliant here, as good as she’s ever been" and said of Benicio del Toro's performance, "with Things We Lost in the Fire, he's managed to top even himself." Jack Mathews of the New York Daily News gave the film 3½ stars and called it "an award contender...in several positions." Mathews said it is "beautifully written" by Allan Loeb and "acted with heartbreaking efficiency by Halle Berry and Benicio del Toro." Los Angeles Daily News critic Glenn Whipp said the film "will probably be most American moviegoers' introduction to the Dogma-flavored direction of Susanne Bier" and said "Newcomers probably won't be as irritated by Bier's herky-jerky, hand-held camerawork, desaturated colors and odd obsession with random close-ups, especially of characters' eyes...For the rest of us, Bier's directorial tics are beginning to wear thin..."

Claudia Puig of USA Today gave the film 3 stars out of 4 and said "The movie makes some missteps, most of them in pacing and length, and the story veers occasionally into melodrama, but it is saved by the powerful performance of Benicio del Toro", calling him "hypnotically watchable." Joe Morgenstern of The Wall Street Journal wrote "Flawed as it is, the movie as a whole is a guilty pleasure." Morgenstern said "del Toro is a fearless actor" and said the film "would be fairly lifeless without him." Morgenstern wrote "Berry is skillful and affecting, occasionally ferocious, and subtle enough for two, in what is essentially a two-character drama." Stephen Holden of The New York Times said the film "is the kind of awards-seeking Hollywood movie that bends over backward to prove that serious American movies can hold their own with the best films from overseas. They don’t, of course, except in very rare instances." Kyle Smith of the New York Post gave the film 1½ stars out of 4 and said the film "was made to win awards, and I'm here to present it with one: the Cliché of the Year honors, otherwise known as the Hackney.

Home media
It was released on DVD and HD DVD on March 4, 2008. A Blu-ray version was released on March 24, 2009.

References

External links
 
 
 
 
 
 

2007 films
2007 drama films
2000s English-language films
American nonlinear narrative films
Films set in Seattle
Films set in Washington (state)
Films shot in Vancouver
Films about heroin addiction
DreamWorks Pictures films
Films directed by Susanne Bier
British drama films
Films produced by Sam Mendes
Films produced by Sam Mercer
Films about widowhood
Films about grieving
Films with screenplays by Allan Loeb
Paramount Pictures films
2000s American films
2000s British films